Samantha Harvey (born 1975), is an English author and a lecturer at Bath Spa University. She has published four novels: The Wilderness (2009), All Is Song (2012), Dear Thief (2014) and The Western Wind (2018). Harvey published a memoir, The Shapeless Unease, in 2020.

Education
Harvey completed the Bath Spa Creative Writing MA course in 2005, and has also completed a postgraduate course in philosophy and a PhD in creative writing.

Career
Her first novel The Wilderness (2009), is written from the point of view of man developing Alzheimer's disease, and describes through increasingly fractured prose the unravelling effect of the disease. Her second novel, All Is Song (2012), is a novel about moral and filial duty, and about the choice between questioning and conforming. The author has described the novel as a loose, modern day reimagining of the life of Socrates.

Her third novel, Dear Thief, is a long letter from a woman to her absent friend, detailing the emotional fallout of a love triangle. The novel is said to be based on the Leonard Cohen song Famous Blue Raincoat. It was published in 2014 by Jonathan Cape. Her fourth novel, The Western Wind, about a priest in fifteenth-century Somerset, was published in March 2018.

Her short stories have appeared in Granta Magazine and on BBC Radio 4.

Harvey's novels have been considered for many prizes, including the Man Booker Prize, the Baileys Women's Prize for Fiction, the James Tait Black Memorial Prize, and the Orange Prize. In 2010 she was named one of the 12 best new British novelists by The Culture Show. In 2019, The Western Wind won the Staunch Book Prize.

She is a senior lecturer on the MA in creative writing at Bath Spa University and a member of the academy for the Rathbones Folio Prize. She was a member of the jury for the 2016 Scotiabank Giller Prize.

Bibliography

Novels

Non-fiction

Nominations and prizes
 Shortlisted for the 2019 Walter Scott Prize for The Western Wind
 Shortlisted for the James Tait Black Memorial Prizes (2015)
 Longlisted for the Jerwood Fiction Uncovered Prize (2015)
 Longlisted for the Baileys Prize for Fiction (2015)
 Shortlisted for the Orange Prize for Fiction (2009)
 Longlisted for the Man Booker Prize (2009)
 Shortlisted for the Guardian First Book Award (2009)
 Winner of the AMI Literature Award (2009)
 Winner of the Betty Trask Prize (2009)

Translations
Harvey's novels have been published in the following translations: Chinese, Dutch, French, German, Greek, Hebrew, Norwegian, Portuguese and Romanian.

References

1975 births
Living people
English women novelists
Alumni of Bath Spa University
Academics of Bath Spa University
English historical novelists
Writers of historical fiction set in the Middle Ages